The Woman Gives is a 1920 American silent adventure drama film directed by Roy William Neill and starring Norma Talmadge, John Halliday, and Edmund Lowe.

Plot
As described in a film magazine, artist Inga Sonderson (Talmadge) and her betrothed sculptor Robert Milton (Lowe) owe their success to Daniel Garford (Halliday), who is popularly acclaimed a genius. When Daniel discovers that his wife (Stewart) has been unfaithful, he abandons his career and drowns his sorrow in drink. Inga exerts every effort to save him from himself, much to her fiance's strenuous objections. She follows Daniel to an opium den and where he comes to a realization of his error. Robert breaks with Inga over her interest in Daniel. Daniel reclaims his popularity, and it is popularly assumed that he is to marry Inga, at the last minute she surprises everyone and marries Robert.

Cast
 Norma Talmadge as Inga Sonderson
 John Halliday as Daniel Garford
 Edmund Lowe as Robert Milton
 Lucille Lee Stewart as Mrs. Garford
 John Smiley as Cornelius
 Edward Keppler as Bowden

Preservation status
The film is preserved at the Library of Congress, Packard Campus for Audio-Visual Conservation, and the Russian Gosfilmofond.

References

External links

Johnson, Owen (1916), The Woman Gives: a Story of Regeneration, Boston: Little, Brown & Company, on the Internet Archive

1920 films
American silent feature films
Films directed by Roy William Neill
American black-and-white films
American adventure drama films
1920s adventure drama films
Films based on American novels
1920 drama films
1920s American films
Silent American drama films
Silent adventure drama films